Kundhanagurthy is a village in Alur taluka, Kurnool district Alur of Kurnool district in Andhra Pradesh, India.

Village

The village is located 14;km from Guntakal and 19;km from Aluru. It is connected by bus to both towns.

Most of the people are farmers; there is only one crop a year because of the limited supply of rainwater.

Temples

The following temples are located in Kundhanagurthy:

 Sivalingaruda Swamy temple(శివలి౦గారుఢ సామి)
 Siva temple (శివలి౦గ రూప౦)
 Hanumantharaya temple (హనుమ౦తుడు)
 Basavanna temple (బసవన)
 Sangameswara temple (స౦గమేశుడు)
 Bata Sunkulamma temple (సు౦కులమ దేవి)

Festival
During the festival of Maha Shivaratri, the Rathayatraa (తేరు) in this village is the special attraction. In 2012 a new RATHAM was made to replace the old one, at a cost of 20 Lakhs of Rupees, by contributions from the village people.

References

Villages in Kurnool district